Vasco Road station (signed as Vasco) is an ACE station on Vasco Road in eastern Livermore, California. The station mainly serves the workers of Lawrence Livermore National Laboratory, Sandia National Laboratory and the surrounding industrial and office parks in eastern Livermore in addition to commuters from Livermore headed to job centers in the Silicon Valley to the southwest.

BART approved an alignment for its Livermore extension to run along Interstate 580 then tunnel underneath Isabel Avenue to the Livermore ACE station and then continue along the right-of-way to Vasco Road to serve as its final terminal. However, in July 2011, the Livermore City Council reversed its position in response to a petition requesting that the alignment stay within or nearby the Interstate 580 right-of-way, and now favors stations be built at the Interstate 580 interchanges with Isabel Avenue and Greenville Road. The BART extension was later replaced with the Valley Link proposal, again along the I-580 alignment.

References

External links 

 ACE Vasco Road Station

Altamont Corridor Express stations in Alameda County, California
Livermore, California
Railway stations in the United States opened in 1998